Negulescu is a Romanian surname. Notable people with the surname include:

Jean Negulesco, born Negulescu (1900–1993), Romanian-American film director and screenwriter
Paul Negulescu
Petre P. Negulescu (1870–1951), Romanian philosopher and politician
Radu Negulescu (born 1941), Romanian table tennis player

Romanian-language surnames